Garrett College is a public community college in McHenry, Maryland. The college has three outreach centers: Accident, Grantsville, and Oakland.

History 
Garrett College was established in 1966, as Garrett Community College, and took its present name in 2002. In 1968, the Garrett Community College Board of Trustees acquired a site in McHenry, Maryland and construction of the campus began shortly thereafter. It officially opened its doors to students in 1971.

In 2012, construction of the Garrett College Community Aquatic and Recreation Complex (CARC) was completed. The CARC is a 42,500 square-foot facility that houses a gymnasium, six-lane competition swimming pool, fully equipped fitness facility, locker and shower rooms, a wet classroom for instruction, multi use classroom space, and a physical and occupational therapy facility. Construction is currently underway to add a state-of-the-art STEM building to Garrett College's main campus and it is scheduled to open August 2018. In 2018, Garrett College announced that it will be moving forward with a new performing arts center. Architecture and engineering work begins July 1, 2018 and construction the following year.

Academics 
Garrett College offers five different associate degrees: Associate in Arts (AA), Associate in Arts in Teaching (AAT), Associate of Science (AS), Associate of Science in Engineering (ASE), and Associate in Applied Science (AAS). Within these degree options, the college offers 12 programs of study and 25 different concentrations. The college also offers ten non-degree transfer options, four certificate programs, and numerous continuing education programs. Taking advantage of its scenic surroundings and nearby Deep Creek Lake, Wisp Ski Resort and the Adventure Sports Center International, Garrett College offers an unusual associate degree in Adventure Sports.

Accreditation 
Garrett College is a member of the Maryland Association of Community Colleges and is one of 16 junior colleges in the state. Garrett College is accredited by the Middle States Commission on Higher Education. The Maryland Higher Education Commission (MHEC) oversees and coordinates higher education in the State of Maryland including academic and financial policies at the college. The college is also accredited and approved for operation by MHEC.

Athletics 
Garrett College is a member of the National Junior College Athletic Association (NJCAA) and Maryland Junior College Athletic Conference (MD JUCO). Garrett College added wrestling in 2017 and became the first Maryland junior college to offer a wrestling program. The college competes in: 
 Baseball 
 Basketball (men's and women's)
 Softball
 Volleyball
 Wrestling

References

External links 
 Official website
 Official athletics website

Community and junior colleges in Maryland
Educational institutions established in 1966
Universities and colleges in Garrett County, Maryland
1966 establishments in Maryland
NJCAA athletics